Aoke/Langalanga, also known as Auki/Langalanga, is a parliamentary constituency electing one representative to the National Parliament of Solomon Islands. It is one of fourteen constituencies in Malaita Province. It is also a relatively new constituency, having been established for the Fifth Parliament in 1993. It had an electorate of 7,365 in 2006.

Aoke/Langalanga was the constituency of Bartholomew Ulufa'alu when he became Prime Minister in 1997. Ulufa'alu lost the premiership in 2000, but continued to hold the seat until his death in 2007. A by-election was then held in 2008, which was won by Democratic Party candidate Matthew Wale.

In the 2010 general election, Wale stood for re-election against five other candidates: Richard Ulufa'alu of the Liberal Party, Judy Barty of OUR Party, and three independents. Wale was re-elected, obtaining 1,681 votes, ahead of independent candidate Billy Kwasimanu (1,512). Independent Tony Wale received exactly 1,000 votes, while the other three candidates trailed far behind: Ulufa'alu obtained 182 votes; Frank Bosi, 62; and Judy Barty, just 58. The turnout rate was 51%.

List of MPs
The following MPs have represented Aoke/Langalanga in the National Parliament, since the seat was created in 1993.

Election results

2019

2014

2010

2008 by-election

2006

2001

1997

1993

References

Solomon Islands parliamentary constituencies
1993 establishments in the Solomon Islands
Constituencies established in 1993